Olena Yunchyk  (born 9 September 1982) is a Ukrainian freestyle skier. She was born in Rivne. She competed at the 1998 Winter Olympics, in women's aerials.

References

External links 
 

1982 births
Sportspeople from Rivne
Living people
Ukrainian female freestyle skiers
Olympic freestyle skiers of Ukraine
Freestyle skiers at the 1998 Winter Olympics